The 1981 Grand Marnier Tennis Games was a men's professional tennis tournament played on outdoor hard courts. It was the eighth edition of the tournament and was part of the Super Series of the 1981 Volvo Grand Prix. It was played at the La Quinta Resort and Club in La Quinta, California in the United States and was held from February 16 through February 22, 1981. First-seeded Jimmy Connors won the singles title.

Finals

Singles

 Jimmy Connors defeated  Ivan Lendl 6–3, 7–6
 It was Connors' 1st singles title of the year and the 86th of his career.

Doubles

 Bruce Manson /  Brian Teacher defeated  Terry Moor /  Eliot Teltscher 7–6, 6–2
 It was Manson's 1st title of the year and the 6th of his career. It was Teacher's 1st title of the year and the 13th of his career.

References

External links
 
 ATP tournament profile
 ITF tournament edition details

La Quinta, California
 
1981 Grand Marnier Tennis Games
Grand Marnier Tennis Games
Grand Marnier Tennis Games
Grand Marnier Tennis Games
Grand Marnier Tennis Games